is a school for the deaf located in Fukui, Fukui Prefecture, Japan. The school educates children in regular school subjects from infant age through high school.

External links
Fukui Prefectural School for the Deaf

Fukui (city)
Schools in Fukui Prefecture
Schools for the deaf in Japan